The Wizard of Oz in Concert: Dreams Come True is a 1995 television musical performance based on the 1939 film The Wizard of Oz (starring Judy Garland). The book and score of the film were performed on stage at Lincoln Center to benefit the Children's Defense Fund. The concert featured guest performers including Jackson Browne as the Scarecrow, Roger Daltrey as the Tin Man, Natalie Cole as Glinda, Joel Grey as the Wizard (a role he reprised in Wicked), Jewel as Dorothy, Nathan Lane as the Cowardly Lion, Debra Winger as the Wicked Witch, and Lucie Arnaz as Aunt Em. The Boys Choir of Harlem appeared as the Munchkins, and Ry Cooder and David Sanborn performed as musicians.

Production
The production consists of an abbreviated script and highlights most songs and musical numbers from the movie. The most notable difference is Uncle Henry and the three farmhands do not appear in this production, but Joel Grey who narrates the Kansas scenes in his role of Professor Marvel and Debra Winger's "Cyclone" narration both mention Miss Gulch. The concert begins with Jewel as Dorothy Gale singing the complete version of "Over the Rainbow". The concert also includes the song "The Jitterbug", which was cut from the original film.

Throughout the entire concert, the conductor and orchestra are featured on-stage with the performers. The performers are predominantly positioned at music stands reading the script and music (similar to reader's theatre). The choreography is different from the 1939 movie: noticeable differences include the Munchkins not dancing and at no point do the four principals (Dorothy, Scarecrow, Tin Man and Cowardly Lion) dance together. Throughout the production, various pieces of Oz artwork by Charles Santore are projected on a screen in the back of the stage.

Various songs were changed to better feature specific talents of individual singers, including "If I Only Had a Brain", which had a folk music tempo to highlight Jackson Browne and "If I Only Had a Heart", which had a rock and roll tempo to highlight Roger Daltrey (Daltrey even swings his microphone, mimicking his Who persona). This stage adaptation omits the Wicked Witch's scene of threatening Dorothy, Scarecrow and Tin Man while being on top of the Tin Man's wooden cottage following this musical number.

The line about suggesting to the Cowardly Lion to count sheep prior to the musical number "If I Only Had the Nerve" is spoken by Dorothy rather than the Tin Man.

Phoebe Snow added a stirring "If I Only Had..." medley set to a solo piano, combining all three of the Scarecrow, Tin Man, and Cowardly Lion's desires.

Nathan Lane's portrayal of the Lion included a version of "If I Were King of the Forest", in which he adds to the lyrics: "not, queen, not duke, not prince...or the Artist Formerly Known as Prince".

This production shortens the Wicked Witch's Castle scenes due to time limit. The Winkies perform their chant, but appear without being dressed as guards and holding pikes. In the scene where Dorothy (Jewel) suffers her imprisonment after Aunt Em's image fades away in the crystal ball, Winger says the line "What a little whiner! I'll give you something to cry about" which was not spoken by Margaret Hamilton. It omits the scene of the Scarecrow, Tin Man, and Lion rescuing Dorothy and the Witch setting the Scarecrow on fire. It immediately leads into the Wicked Witch's meltdown scene followed by the musical number "Hail! Hail! The Witch is Dead" which was also cut from the original film.

Unlike Jack Haley, Daltrey as the Tin Man hugged the Wizard (Joel Grey) toward the end with a pleasant "Thank you from the bottom of my heart!". The Wizard did not depart from the Emerald City inside a hot-air balloon due to being in the same scene as Glinda the Good Witch.

The performance was originally broadcast November 22 on both TNT and TBS, and issued on CD and VHS video in 1996. The video has not yet been released on DVD. Both the CD and video are currently out-of-print. However it is currently available on Youtube.

Cast
 Jewel as Dorothy Gale
 Joel Grey as Narrator of Kansas/Professor Marvel/Gatekeeper of Emerald City/Coachman with "Horse of a Different Color"/Doorman to Wizard's Palace/ The Wizard 
 Jackson Browne as Scarecrow
 Roger Daltrey as Tin Man
 Nathan Lane as Cowardly Lion
 Natalie Cole as Glinda the Good Witch of the North
 Debra Winger as Narrator of Cyclone/Wicked Witch of the West
 Lucie Arnaz as Aunt Em
 James Waller as Toto
 Boys Choir of Harlem as The Munchkins
 Alfre Woodard as Hostess
 Images as Crows/The Winkies 
 Phoebe Snow performs medley reprise of "If I Only Had a Brain; a Heart; the Nerve". She also performs in the finale.
 Ronnie Spector performs "Hail, Hail the Witch is Dead" with Dr. John Jonathan Osborn

See also
 The Wizard of Oz adaptations

References

External links
 

1995 in American music
1995 in New York City
Benefit concerts in the United States
Films based on The Wizard of Oz
Musicals based on The Wizard of Oz
Concert films
Lincoln Center
1990s English-language films